Semakookiro, also spelled as Ssemakookiro, whose full name is Semakookiro Wasajja Nabbunga, was Kabaka of the Kingdom of Buganda, from 1797 until 1814. He was the twenty-seventh (27th) Kabaka of Buganda.

Claim to the throne
He was the son of Kabaka Kyabaggu Kabinuli, Kabaka of Buganda, who reigned between 1750 and 1780. His mother was Nanteza, the seventeenth (17th) of his father's twenty (20) wives. He ascended the throne after the death of his brother, Kabaka Jjunju Sendegeya, whom Semakookiro defeated and killed in the Battle of Kiwawu in 1797. He established his capital at Kasangati.

Married life
He is recorded to have married fifteen (15) wives:

 Naabakyaala Nansikombi Ndwadd'ewazibwa, the Kaddulubaale, daughter of Luyombo, of the Nsenene (Grasshopper) clan
 Balambi, daughter of Sembuzi, of the Ndiga clan
 Bawedde, daughter of Nakato, of the Mbogo clan
 Bwaayita, daughter of Jjumba, of the Nkima clan
 Guluma, daughter of Lusinga, of the Ntalaganya clan
 Gwowoleza, daughter of Luzige, of the Ndiga clan
 Jajjaw'abaana, daughter of Serusa, of the Ndiga clan
 Naabakyaala Kikubula, Nassaza, daughter of Luzige, of the Ndiga clan
 Nabisunsa, daughter of Mukusu, of the Mpindi clan
 Namatama, daughter of Malunda, of the Ndiga clan
 Seb'andabawa, daughter of Nkali, of the Ngeye clan
 Naabakyaala Sirisa, Kabejja, daughter of Sekiwedde, of the Mamba clan
 Sikyayinza, daughter of Jjumba, of the Nkima clan
 Naabakyaala Namisango, Naabagereka, daughter of Luyombo, of the Nsenene (Grasshopper) clan
 Naabakyaala Nasuzewabi, daughter of Bunnya, of the Nsenene clan

Issue
The children of Kabaka Semakookiro included the following:

 Prince (Omulangira) Kanaakulya Mukasa, who succeeded his father as Kabaka Kamaanya Kadduwamala, Kabaka of Buganda, whose mother was Ndwadd'ewazibwa
 Princess (Omumbejja) Ndagire, whose mother was Ndwadd'ewazibwa
 Prince (Omulangira) Luyenje, whose mother was Bawedde
 Prince (Omulangira) Tebattagwaabwe, whose mother was Bwaayita
 Prince (Omulangira) Nyiningabo. He was killed by being burned alive at Benga, for rebellion against his father.
 Prince (Omulangira) Kafunende. He was killed by being burned alive at Benga, for rebellion against his father.
 Prince (Omulangira) Kiyimba, whose mother was Seb'andabawa
 Prince (Omulangira) Kakirebwe, whose mother was Sirisa
 Prince (Omulangira) Kakungulu, whose mother was Sikyayinza. Prince Kakungulu became the father of twins, born before 1814
 Prince (Omulangira) Mutebi I, whose mother was Gwowoleza. He was killed by drowning in Busoga for rebellion against his father
 Prince (Omulangira) Mutebi II, whose mother was Jajjaw'abaana). He contested the succession of his brother in 1814, but was defeated and fled to Bukoba, in Kyaggwe.
 Prince (Omulangira) Zzimbe, whose mother was Namatama
 Princess (Omumbejja) Nakuyita, whose mother was Balambi
 Princess (Omumbejja) Nabisalo, whose mother was Guluma
 Princess (Omumbejja) Nagaddya, whose mother was Nabisunsa
 Princess (Omumbejja) Nabinaka

He increased the growth of Mituba (Ficus_natalensis) trees and production of Barkcloth in Buganda.

The final years
Kabaka Semakookiro died from an affliction, in old age at the Jjunju Palace at Kasangati, in Kyaddondo County. He was initially buried at Kasangati. In 1869, his remains were exhumed and re-buried at Kisimbiri in Busiro County.

Quotes
"But he understood his own gross and cruel age. He also understood men. They were treacherous. The precautionary measures he had taken to preserve his throne enabled him to be the first king in more than a century to die a natural death. If nineteenth-century kings of Buganda wielded enormous despotic powers as indeed they did, part of the credit must be given to Semakokiro."
 MM Semakula Kiwanuka, A History of Buganda, 1971

Succession table

See also
 Kabaka of Buganda

References

External links
List of the Kings of Buganda

Kabakas of Buganda
18th-century monarchs in Africa
19th-century monarchs in Africa